The Spanish Singer is an 1860 oil painting on canvas by the French painter Édouard Manet, conserved since 1949 at the Metropolitan Museum of Art of New York.

Composed in Manet's studio, it employed a model and props which were later used for at least one other painting. This work, both realistic and exotic in its depiction of its subject, exhibits the influence of Spanish art, especially that of Diego Velázquez, on Manet's style. Manet, due to this painting, was accepted for the first time at the Salon of Paris in 1861, where he also exhibited a portrait of his parents.

The Spanish Singer received positive criticism at the time and won a decent mention. It was appreciated by French writer Charles Baudelaire, and by French journalist and literary critic Theophile Gautier, who praised the painting for its "very true color" and "vigorous brush". Manet consequently became the leader of the avant-garde movement and inspired a group of young artists, including Henri Fantin-Latour and Carolus-Duran, who decided to visit Manet's studio.

Spanish Themes by Manet in the MET

References

1860 paintings
19th-century portraits
Musical instruments in art
Portraits by Édouard Manet
Paintings in the collection of the Metropolitan Museum of Art
Portraits of men